La Calzada de Béjar is a village and municipality in the province of Salamanca,  western Spain, part of the autonomous community of Castile and León.

Geography

See also
List of municipalities in Salamanca

References

Municipalities in the Province of Salamanca